Abel Pifre (1852–1928), was a French engineer who developed the first solar power printing press. He was initially an assistant to Augustin Bernard Mouchot who developed the first solar engine, but later developed solar technologies independently of his mentor.

Pifre demonstrated his press at a meeting of the Union Francaise de la Jeunesse at the Jardin des Tuileries in Paris on 6 August 1882.

The device consisted of a concave mirror 3.5 meters in diameter centering on a cylindrical steam boiler, which powered a small vertical engine of 2/5 horse power, and then driving a Marioni type printing-press.

Even under semi-overcast conditions, the press operated continuously from 1:00 pm to 5:30 pm, producing approximately five hundred copies per hour of a journal which was produced specifically for the event with the appropriate name "Soleil-Journal".

References 
 La Nature Journal Gaston Tissandier, 26 August 1882, p 193

Tissandier G.  Utilization de la Chaleur du Soleil—Imprimerie Solaire.  La Nature Journal 1882 Aug 26; No. 482, pg.193 
http://cnum.cnam.fr/PDF/cnum_4KY28.19.pdf  Note: scroll to page 198 of the CNUM PDF.

External links 
 Metal Type - Solar Powered Printing Press
 The Beautiful Possibility Paul Collins, 2002
 Énergie solaire (in French)

French engineers
1852 births
1928 deaths
People associated with solar power